Relentlessly Yours is the third solo album and sixteenth studio album release overall by Spencer Albee. The album was released in stores on May 16, 2017, with a release party at Port City Music Hall on June 2, 2017. A limited edition compilation EP featuring four unreleased B-side tracks from the Mistakes Were Made recording sessions was released on April 22, 2017.

Track listing
"Just Like Clockwork" - 2:40
"Nothing Left to Lose" - 3:02
"Feeling Lucky" - 3:45
"Instrumental Breakdown" - 4:18
"You'll Be the Death of Me" - 3:23
"All Is Quiet on the Western Prom" - 3:14
"You Swept Me off My Feet" - 3:14
"Miss U2" - 2:27
"Too Much" - 3:57
"Open Heart" - 4:27
"Ten to One" - 3:10

References

2017 albums
Spencer Albee albums